Mandarbaria Beach is a beach in Bangladesh in Shyamnagar Upazila of the Satkhira District. The beach is not a popular destination for tourists or locals. It is an  beach near the forest in the same name. The banks of the Hariabhanga River can be seen from the beach. The Sundarbans mangrove forest is located at one end of the beach. It is part of Sundarbans.

References

External links 
 Mandarbariya Beach Satkhira Travel Mate
 Satkhira DC Office 

Beaches of Bangladesh
Satkhira District
Bay of Bengal